Mart Klepp (born 19 April 1963) is a Canadian sports shooter. He competed in two events at the 1988 Summer Olympics.

References

External links
 

1963 births
Living people
Canadian male sport shooters
Olympic shooters of Canada
Shooters at the 1988 Summer Olympics
Sportspeople from Guelph
Commonwealth Games medallists in shooting
Commonwealth Games gold medallists for Canada
Commonwealth Games bronze medallists for Canada
Pan American Games medalists in shooting
Pan American Games silver medalists for Canada
Pan American Games bronze medalists for Canada
Shooters at the 1987 Pan American Games
Shooters at the 1991 Pan American Games
Medalists at the 1987 Pan American Games
Medalists at the 1991 Pan American Games
Shooters at the 1990 Commonwealth Games
20th-century Canadian people
Medallists at the 1990 Commonwealth Games